Provincial Government station is a subway station in Tianxin District, Changsha, Hunan, China, operated by the Changsha subway operator Changsha Metro. It entered revenue service on June 28, 2016.

History 
The station opened on 28 June 2016.

Layout

Surrounding area
 Entrance No. 1: Hunan Provincial Government
 Entrance No. 2: Xiangfu Cultural Park, Hunan Provincial Art Museum, Hunan Cultural Affairs
 Entrance No. 2: Changsha Xingcheng Rongyu Hotel
 Entrance No. 4: Tianxin District Government

References

Railway stations in Hunan
Railway stations in China opened in 2016